The Rosedale Valley Bridge (also called the Rosedale Ravine Bridge) is a covered arch bridge in the northeast of Downtown Toronto, Ontario. Built in 1966 by architect John B. Parkin (now part of Delcan Corporation), the concrete bridge carries Line 2 trains of the subway across the Rosedale Ravine.

The eastern end of the Rosedale Valley Bridge is situated at the west end of Castle Frank station. The bridge itself runs on the north side of and almost parallel to the Rosedale section of the Prince Edward Viaduct. The viaduct opened in 1918 and had a lower deck over its entire length designed for rail transport. When the first phase of the Bloor subway line opened, its tracks used the lower deck of the main phase across the Don River Valley to the east as originally intended. However, since the approach curves leading to the Rosedale section would be too sharp for the trains, the dedicated Rosedale Valley Bridge was built to carry them, and the lower deck of the original viaduct remains unused.

Although the bridge once had open skylights for ventilation, they were later covered to reduce noise to the surrounding area. It can be seen from the north side of Bloor Street, which crosses from the adjacent Prince Edward Viaduct, or from below on Rosedale Valley Road which it passes over.

Other bridges
Besides the Rosedale Valley Bridge and Prince Edward Viaduct, there are three other bridges that span above Rosedale Valley Road:

 Glen Road Bridge: a pedestrian only deck truss bridge built after the 1950s to replace a late 19th Century road bridge
 Sherborne Street Bridge: original deck truss bridge was built before 1909, demolished in 1952 and replaced by current steel beam bridge
 Mount Pleasant Road Bridge: deck truss bridge built in 1943

References

Bridges completed in 1966
Bridges in Toronto
Concrete bridges in Canada
Covered bridges in Canada
Don River (Ontario)
Open-spandrel deck arch bridges in Canada
Railway bridges in Ontario
Road-rail bridges
Viaducts in Canada